Boggs Mill is a historic grist mill located near Seneca Rocks, Pendleton County, West Virginia. It was built about 1830, and is a 3 1/2-story, rectangular, gable front building. It has clapboard siding and was constructed using mortise and tenon, braced frame construction. It sits on a stone foundation and has a standing-seam metal roof.  The mill remained in operation until 1966; it was damaged by a severe flood in 1985.

It was listed on the National Register of Historic Places in 2004.

References

Grinding mills on the National Register of Historic Places in West Virginia
Industrial buildings completed in 1830
Buildings and structures in Pendleton County, West Virginia
Grinding mills in West Virginia
National Register of Historic Places in Pendleton County, West Virginia
1830 establishments in Virginia